Anomalochaeta is a genus of flies belonging to the family Opomyzidae.

The species of this genus are found in Europe.

Species:
 Anomalochaeta guttipennis (Zetterstedt, 1838)

References

Opomyzidae